Don Bosco may refer to:

 John Bosco (Italy, 1815–1888), a Catholic priest and saint of the Roman Catholic Church and the Anglican Communion
 Salesians of Don Bosco, a Roman Catholic religious order
 Salesian Sisters of Don Bosco, a Roman Catholic religious order
 Don Bosco, Buenos Aires, a city in Argentina
 Don Bosco, Parañaque, a village in the Philippines
 Don Bosco (Panama Metro), a rapid transit station in Panama City, Panama
 Don Bosco FC, a club from Pétion-Ville, Haiti
 Don Bosco FC (Puerto Rico), a club from San Juan, Puerto Rico
 Don Bosco SC, a club from Negombo, Sri Lanka
 Don Bosco Jarabacoa FC, a club from Jarabacoa, Dominican Republic
 CS Don Bosco, a club from Lubumbashi, DR Congo
 DJK Don Bosco Bamberg, an association football club from Bamberg, Germany
  Don Bosco (1935 film), a 1935 Italian film directed by Goffredo Alessandrini
  Don Bosco (1988 film), a 1988 Italian film starring Ben Gazzara and Patsy Kensit
 Don Bosco (author), an author from Singapore
 Don Bosco (telenovela), a Mexican telenovela
 Malvasia di Castelnuovo Don Bosco, an Italian wine
 Don Bosco Parish, a parish in Baguio City, Philippines

See also
 Don Bosco School (disambiguation)